Kasempa is a constituency of the National Assembly of Zambia. It covers the towns of Ingwe, Kapiji, Kasempa and Kawana in Kasempa District of North-Western Province.

List of MPs

References

Constituencies of the National Assembly of Zambia
Constituencies established in 1964
1964 establishments in Zambia